The 2013 FIFA Club World Cup final was the final match of the 2013 FIFA Club World Cup, an association football tournament hosted by Morocco. It was the 10th final of the FIFA Club World Cup, a FIFA-organised tournament between the winners of the six continental confederations as well as the host nation's league champions.

The final was contested between German club Bayern Munich, representing UEFA as the reigning champions of the UEFA Champions League, and Moroccan club Raja Casablanca, representing the host country as the reigning champions of the Botola. It was played at the Stade de Marrakech in Marrakesh on 21 December 2013.

Background

Bayern Munich
Bayern Munich qualified for the tournament as winners of the 2012–13 UEFA Champions League, following a 2–1 win against Borussia Dortmund in the final. This was Bayern Munich's first time competing in the tournament. They twice won the Intercontinental Cup, the predecessor of the FIFA Club World Cup, in 1976 and 2001. They reached the final after defeating Chinese club Guangzhou Evergrande in the semi-finals.

Raja Casablanca
Raja Casablanca won the 2012–13 Botola to earn the host country berth of the tournament. This was Raja Casablanca's second time competing in the tournament, having participated in the competition in the inaugural edition in 2000. They were the second team to reach the final of the competition (after Corinthians in 2000) under the condition of being the host nation's national champions, as well as the second African finalist (after TP Mazembe in 2010). They reached the final after defeating New Zealand club Auckland City in the play-off round, Mexican club Monterrey in the quarter-finals, and Brazilian club Atletico Mineiro in the semi-finals.

Route to the final

Match

Summary
Bayern Munich defender Dante opened the scoring in the seventh minute; after Jérôme Boateng headed Xherdan Shaqiri's corner into his path, he turned and shot past goalkeeper Khalid Askri. Thiago got the second for Bayern in the 22nd minute, when he shot right-footed into the far corner from the edge of the penalty area after a pull-back pass from the left from David Alaba. Bayern had the chance to add a third midway through the second half, but Shaqiri hit the crossbar from six yards before Thiago shot the rebound high and wide. Raja Casablanca almost got themselves back into the game late on, when Vianney Mabidé found himself onside only to shoot straight at Manuel Neuer in the Bayern goal, and captain Mouhcine Moutouali hit the rebound over the bar from just outside the goal area.

Details

See also
FC Bayern Munich in international football competitions

References

External links
FIFA Club World Cup Morocco 2013, FIFA.com

Final
2013
FC Bayern Munich matches
Raja CA matches
2013–14 in German football
2013–14 in Moroccan football
Sports competitions in Marrakesh
21st century in Marrakesh
December 2013 sports events in Africa